Frank Cornelis Verhulst (born August 18, 1951) is a Dutch psychiatrist and epidemiologist who is a research professor at Erasmus MC in Rotterdam, the Netherlands. He is also an adjunct professor in the Department of Clinical Medicine at the University of Copenhagen in Copenhagen, Denmark. His research focuses mainly on child psychopathology and psychiatric epidemiology.

References

External links

Dutch psychiatrists
Living people
1951 births
Erasmus University Rotterdam alumni
Academic staff of Erasmus University Rotterdam
Physicians from Rotterdam
Academic staff of the University of Copenhagen
Dutch epidemiologists